The Jelgava–Krustpils Railway is a  long,  gauge railway built in the 19th century to connect Ventspils and Moscow.

References 

Railway lines in Latvia
Jelgava
Railway lines opened in 1904
5 ft gauge railways in Latvia
1520 mm gauge railways in Russia